This is list of the tallest buildings and structures in Egypt's New Administrative Capital.

Skyscrapers and Towers under-construction

MU10

MU07

MU19

Future Proposed Towers

References

Tallest, New Administrative Capital
New Administrative Capital